Mitchell is an unincorporated community located in Pendleton County, West Virginia, United States.

References

Unincorporated communities in Pendleton County, West Virginia
Unincorporated communities in West Virginia